Cahuilla traditional narratives include myths, legends, tales, and oral histories preserved by the Cahuilla people of the Colorado Desert and Peninsular Ranges of southern California.

Cahuilla oral literature has much in common with the traditions of the other Takic-speaking groups of southern California and with the Yumans of southern California, western Arizona, and northern Baja California. (See also Traditional narratives (Native California).)

Sources for Cahuilla narratives
 Apodaca, Paul (1999). Tradition, myth, and performance of Cahuilla bird songs. Unpublished Ph.D. dissertation, Department of Folklore & Mythology, University of California, Los Angeles, CA.
 Apodaca, Paul (with Luke Madrigal) (1999). "Cahuilla bird songs", California Chronicles, 2(2): 4–8.
 Bean, Lowell John (1992). "Menil (Moon): Symbolic Representation of Cahuilla Woman". In Earth & Sky: Visions of the Cosmos in Native American Folklore, edited by Ray A. Williamson and Claire R. Farrer, pp. 162–83. University of New Mexico Press, Albuquerque, NM. (Summary, interpretation, and some original presentation of Cahuilla myths.)
 Curtis, Edward S. The North American Indian. 20 vols. Plimpton Press, Norwood, MA. (Desert and Pass Cahuilla versions of the Creation myth, collected from Charley Alamo and William Pablo, vol. 15, pp. 106–21.)
 
 Gifford, Edward Winslow, and Gwendoline Harris Block (1930). California Indian Nights. Arthur H. Clark, Glendale, CA. (Three previously published narratives, pp. 196–98, 227–32.)
 Hooper, Lucile (1920). "The Cahuilla Indians". University of California Publications in American Archaeology and Ethnology 16:315–380. Berkeley, CA. (Myths collected in 1918, pp. 317–28, 364–78.)
 Kroeber, A. L. (1925). Handbook of the Indians of California. Bureau of American Ethnology Bulletin No. 78. Washington, DC (Brief comments on the Creation myth, pp. 707.)
 Margolin, Malcolm (1993). The Way We Lived: California Indian Stories, Songs, and Reminiscences. First edition 1981. Heyday Books, Berkeley, CA. (Creation myth, pp. 124–25, from Hooper 1920.)
  
 . . 
 Saubel, Katherine Siva (1968). "Adventures of Konvaxmal". Indian Historian 1(4):28. (One myth.)
 Seiler, Hansjakob (1970). Cahuilla Texts. Indiana University Research Center for the Language Sciences, Bloomington, IN.
 Strong, William Duncan (1929). "Aboriginal Society in Southern California". University of California Publications in American Archaeology and Ethnology 26:1–358. Berkeley. (Desert and Pass Cahuilla myths and legends, pp. 86–87, 100–02, 109, 130–43.)
 Woosley, David J. (1908). "Cahuilla Tales". Journal of American Folklore 21:239–40. (Two brief narratives from the Colorado Desert.)

See also
 Cahuilla language
 Cahuilla mythology

External links
 The North American Indian by Edward S. Curtis (1926)

Cahuilla
Traditional narratives (Native California)